A Confederacy of Dunces is a picaresque novel by American novelist John Kennedy Toole which reached publication in 1980, eleven years after Toole's death. Published through the efforts of writer Walker Percy (who also contributed a foreword) and Toole's mother, Thelma, the book became first a cult classic, then a mainstream success; it earned Toole a posthumous Pulitzer Prize for Fiction in 1981, and is now considered a canonical work of modern literature of the Southern United States.

The book's title refers to an epigram from Jonathan Swift's essay  Thoughts on Various Subjects, Moral and Diverting: "When a true genius appears in the world, you may know him by this sign, that the dunces are all in confederacy against him." Its central character, Ignatius J. Reilly, is an educated but slothful 30-year-old man living with his mother in the Uptown neighborhood of early-1960s New Orleans who, in his quest for employment, has various adventures with colorful French Quarter characters. Toole wrote the novel in 1963 during his last few months in Puerto Rico.

Synopsis
Ignatius Jacques Reilly is an overweight and unemployed thirty-year-old with a degree in Medieval History who lives with his mother, Irene Reilly. He utterly loathes the world around him, which he feels has lost the values of geometry and theology. One afternoon, Reilly's mother drives him "downtown in the old Plymouth, and while she was at the doctor's seeing about her arthritis, Ignatius had bought some sheet music at Werlein's for his trumpet and a new string for his lute." While Reilly waits for his mother, Officer Angelo Mancuso approaches Reilly and demands that the latter produce identification. Affronted and outraged by Mancuso's unwarranted zeal and officious manner, Reilly protests his innocence to the crowd while denouncing the city's vices and the graft of the local police. An elderly man, Claude Robichaux, takes Reilly's side, denouncing Officer Mancuso and the police as communists. In the resulting uproar, Reilly and his embarrassed mother escape, taking refuge in a bar in case Officer Mancuso is still in hot pursuit.

In the bar, Mrs. Reilly then drinks too much. As a result, she crashes her car. The fallout for the accident totals $1020, a sizable amount of money in early 1960s New Orleans. Ignatius is forced to work for the first time in many years in order to help his mother pay for the accident.

What follows is a series of adventures that introduce an assorted cast of characters and their interactions with each other due to, or with, Ignatius as he moves from low wage job to job. Throughout the novel, Ignatius obsesses over his wardrobe, verbally abuses his mother, and frequents movie theaters only to yell and condemn the actors and actresses on screen. The novel explores the psyche of a man who is debilitated every time he is stressed out due to a rare stomach condition and an adversarial relationship possibly disguised as flirtation with the politically liberal advocate Myrna Minkoff, his only friend from college.

Major characters

Ignatius J. Reilly
Ignatius Jacques Reilly is something of a modern Don Quixote—eccentric, idealistic, and creative, sometimes to the point of delusion. In his foreword to the book, Walker Percy describes Ignatius as a "slob extraordinary, a mad Oliver Hardy, a fat Don Quixote, a perverse Thomas Aquinas rolled into one". He disdains modernity, particularly pop culture. The disdain becomes his obsession: he goes to movies in order to mock their perversity and express his outrage with the contemporary world's lack of "theology and geometry". He prefers the scholastic philosophy of the Middle Ages, and the Early Medieval philosopher Boethius in particular. However, he also enjoys many modern comforts and conveniences and is given to claiming that the rednecks of rural Louisiana hate all modern technology, which they associate with unwanted change. The workings of his pyloric valve play an important role in his life, reacting strongly to incidents in a fashion that he likens to Cassandra in terms of prophetic significance.

Ignatius is of the mindset that he does not belong in the world and that his numerous failings are the work of some higher power. He continually refers to the goddess Fortuna as having spun him downwards on her wheel of fortune. Ignatius loves to eat, and his masturbatory fantasies lead in strange directions. His mockery of obscene images is portrayed as a defensive posture to hide their titillating effect on him. Although considering himself to have an expansive and learned worldview, Ignatius has an aversion to ever leaving the town of his birth, and frequently bores friends and strangers with the story of his sole, abortive journey out of New Orleans, a trip to Baton Rouge on a Greyhound Scenicruiser bus, which Ignatius recounts as a traumatic ordeal of extreme horror.

Myrna Minkoff
Myrna Minkoff, referred to by Ignatius as "that minx," is a Jewish beatnik from New York City, whom Ignatius met while she was in college in New Orleans. Though their political, social, religious, and personal orientations could hardly be more different, Myrna and Ignatius fascinate one another. The novel repeatedly refers to Myrna and Ignatius having engaged in tag-team attacks on the teachings of their college professors. For most of the novel, she is seen only in the regular correspondence which the two sustain since her return to New York, a correspondence heavily weighted with sexual analysis on the part of Myrna and contempt for her apparent sacrilegious activity by Ignatius. Officially, they both deplore everything the other stands for. Though neither of them will admit it, their correspondence indicates that, separated though  they are by half a continent, many of their actions are meant to impress one another.

Irene Reilly
Mrs. Irene Reilly is the mother of Ignatius. She has been widowed for 21 years. At first, she allows Ignatius his space and drives him where he needs to go, but over the course of the novel she learns to stand up for herself. She also has a drinking problem, most frequently indulging in muscatel, although Ignatius exaggerates that she is a raving, abusive drunk.

She falls for Claude Robichaux, a fairly well-off man with a railroad pension and rental properties. At the end of the novel, she decides she will marry Claude. But first, she agrees with Santa Battaglia (who has not only recently become Mrs. Reilly's new best friend, but also harbors an intense dislike for Ignatius) that Ignatius is insane and arranges to have him sent to a mental hospital.

Others
Santa Battaglia, a "grammaw" who is friends with Mrs. Reilly and has a marked disdain for Ignatius
Claude Robichaux, an old man constantly on the lookout for any "communiss" who might infiltrate the United States; he takes an interest in protecting Irene 
Angelo Mancuso, an inept police officer, the nephew of Santa Battaglia, who, after an abortive attempt to arrest Ignatius as a "suspicious character," features prominently in the novel as Ignatius's self-perceived nemesis  
Lana Lee, a pornographic model who runs the "Night of Joy," a downscale French Quarter strip club 
George, Lana's distributor, who sells photographs of her to high-school children
Darlene, a goodhearted but none-too-bright girl, who aspires to be a "Night of Joy" stripper, with a pet cockatoo
Burma Jones, a black janitor for the "Night of Joy" who holds on to his below-minimum wage job only to avoid being arrested for vagrancy
Mr. Clyde, the frustrated owner of Paradise Vendors, a hot dog vendor business, who inadvisedly employs Ignatius as a vendor
Gus Levy, the reluctant, mostly absentee owner of Levy Pants, an inherited family business in the Bywater neighborhood where Ignatius briefly works
Mrs. Levy, Gus's wife, who attempts to psychoanalyze her husband and Miss Trixie despite being completely unqualified to do so
Miss Trixie, an aged clerk at Levy Pants who suffers from dementia and compulsive hoarding
Mr. Gonzalez, the meek office manager at Levy Pants
Dorian Greene, a flamboyant French Quarter homosexual who puts on elaborate parties
Frieda Club, Betty Bumper, and Liz Steele, a trio of aggressive lesbians who run afoul of Ignatius
Dr. Talc, a mediocre professor at Tulane who had the misfortune of teaching Myrna and Ignatius
Miss Annie, the disgruntled neighbor of the Reillys who professes an addiction to headache medicine

Ignatius at the movies
Toole provides comical descriptions of two of the films Ignatius watches without naming them; they can be recognized as Billy Rose's Jumbo and That Touch of Mink, both Doris Day features released in 1962.  In another passage, Ignatius declines to see another film, a "widely praised Swedish drama about a man who was losing his soul".  This is most likely Ingmar Bergman's Winter Light, released in early 1963. In another passage, Irene Reilly recalls the night Ignatius was conceived: after she and her husband viewed Red Dust, released in October 1932.

Confederacy and New Orleans

The book is famous for its rich depiction of New Orleans and the city's dialects, including Yat. Many locals and writers think that it is the best and most accurate depiction of the city in a work of fiction.

A bronze statue of Ignatius J. Reilly can be found under the clock on the down-river side of the 800 block of Canal Street, New Orleans, the former site of the D. H. Holmes Department Store, now the Hyatt French Quarter Hotel. The statue mimics the opening scene: Ignatius waits for his mother under the D.H. Holmes clock, clutching a Werlein's shopping bag, dressed in a hunting cap, flannel shirt, baggy pants and scarf, 'studying the crowd of people for signs of bad taste.' The statue is modeled on New Orleans actor John "Spud" McConnell, who portrayed Ignatius in a stage version of the novel.

Various local businesses are mentioned in addition to D. H. Holmes, including Werlein's Music Store and local cinemas such as the Prytania Theater. Some readers from elsewhere assume Ignatius's favorite soft drink, Dr. Nut, to be fictitious, but it was an actual local soft drink brand of the era. The "Paradise Hot Dogs" vending carts are an easily recognized satire of those actually branded "Lucky Dogs".

Structure
The structure of A Confederacy of Dunces reflects the structure of Ignatius's favorite book, Boethius' The Consolation of Philosophy. Like Boethius' book, A Confederacy of Dunces is divided into chapters that are further divided into a varying number of subchapters. Key parts of some chapters are outside of the main narrative. In Consolation, sections of narrative prose alternate with metrical verse. In Confederacy, such narrative interludes vary more widely in form and include light verse, journal entries by Ignatius, and also letters between himself and Myrna. A copy of The Consolation of Philosophy within the narrative itself also becomes an explicit plot device in several ways.

The difficult path to publication
As outlined in the introduction to a later revised edition, the book would never have been published if Toole's mother had not found a smeared carbon copy of the manuscript left in the house following Toole's 1969 death at 31. She was persistent and tried several different publishers, to no avail.

Thelma repeatedly called Walker Percy, an author and college instructor at Loyola University New Orleans, to demand for him to read it. He initially resisted; however, as he recounts in the book's foreword:

The book was published by LSU Press in 1980. It won the Pulitzer Prize for Fiction in 1981. In 2005, Blackstone Audio released an unabridged audiobook of the novel, read by Barrett Whitener.

While Tulane University in New Orleans retains a collection of Toole's papers, and some early drafts have been found, the location of the original manuscript is unknown.

Adaptations
In March 1984, LSU staged a musical  adaptation of the book, with book and lyrics by Frank Galati and music by Edward Zelnis; actor Scott Harlan played Ignatius.

Kerry Shale read the book for BBC Radio 4's Book at Bedtime in 1982, and later adapted the book into a one-man show which he performed at the Adelaide Festival in 1990, at the Gate Theatre in London, and for BBC Radio.

There have been repeated attempts to turn the book into a film. In 1982, Harold Ramis was to write and direct an adaptation, starring John Belushi as Ignatius and Richard Pryor as Burma Jones, but Belushi's death prevented this. Later, John Candy and Chris Farley were touted for the lead, but both of them, like Belushi, also died at an early age, leading many to ascribe a curse to the role of Ignatius.

Director John Waters was interested in directing an adaptation that would have starred Divine, who also died at an early age, as Ignatius.

British performer and writer Stephen Fry was at one point commissioned to adapt Toole's book for the screen. He was sent to New Orleans by Paramount Studios in 1997 to get background for a screenplay adaptation.

John Goodman, a longtime resident of New Orleans, was slated to play Ignatius at one point.

A version adapted by Steven Soderbergh and Scott Kramer, and slated to be directed by David Gordon Green, was scheduled for release in 2005.  The film was to star Will Ferrell as Ignatius and Lily Tomlin as Irene. A staged reading of the script took place at the 8th Nantucket Film Festival, with Ferrell as Ignatius, Anne Meara as Irene, Paul Rudd as Officer Mancuso, Kristen Johnston as Lana Lee, Mos Def as Burma Jones, Rosie Perez as Darlene, Olympia Dukakis as Santa Battaglia and Miss Trixie, Natasha Lyonne as Myrna, Alan Cumming as Dorian Greene, John Shea as Gonzales, Jesse Eisenberg as George, John Conlon as Claude Robichaux, Jace Alexander as Bartender Ben, Celia Weston as Miss Annie, Miss Inez & Mrs. Levy, and Dan Hedaya as Mr. Levy.

Various reasons are cited as to why the Soderbergh version has yet to be filmed. They include disorganization and lack of interest at Paramount Pictures, Helen Hill the head of the Louisiana State Film Commission being murdered, and the devastating effects of Hurricane Katrina on New Orleans. When asked why the film was never made, Will Ferrell has said it is a "mystery".

In 2012, there was a version in negotiation with director James Bobin and potentially starring Zach Galifianakis.

In a 2013 interview, Steven Soderbergh remarked "I think it's cursed. I'm not prone to superstition, but that project has got bad mojo on it."

In November 2015, Huntington Theatre Company introduced a stage version of A Confederacy of Dunces written by Jeffrey Hatcher in their Avenue of the Arts/BU Theatre location in Boston, starring Nick Offerman as Ignatius J. Reilly. It set a record as the company's highest-grossing production.

Critical reception

On November 5, 2019, the BBC News included A Confederacy of Dunces on its list of the 100 most inspiring novels. Confederacy of Dunces is regularly included on lists of 'most funny' or 'best comedic novel'.

See also

 List of works published posthumously
Development hell

References

Sources

Further reading 
 .
 .
 .
 , three scholarly articles (including one free full text) and other materials.
 .
  (literary analysis, chapter 15).
 
 
 .
 .
 .
 .
 .
 .
 .
 .

External links

 .  Written when the latest film adaptation was still scheduled to go ahead.
  on the problems plaguing the film adaptation.
  of first edition Confederacy of Dunces.
 .  A tour of Confederacy locations.

Novels set in the 1960s
1980 American novels
American comedy novels
American satirical novels
Novels published posthumously
Novels set in New Orleans
Picaresque novels
Pulitzer Prize for Fiction-winning works
Southern Gothic novels
PEN/Faulkner Award for Fiction-winning works
American novels adapted into plays
Louisiana State University Press books